Qianli chuan were paddle wheel boats used in medieval China. The boats were driven by human pedaling and were able to cruise hundreds of kilometers per day with no wind blowing.

History
Qianli chuan were invented in the late 5th century AD during the Southern Qi Dynasty and the invention is attributed to the ancient Chinese astronomer and mathematician Zu Chongzhi. References made to the boat were made recalling various tests on the Xinting River, south of modern Nanjing. The boat was proven to be able to cruise several hundred kilometers in a single day without any wind blowing. Late 8th century AD records have descriptions of the Qianli chuan as a type of naval boat that had two wheels found on its sides that was propelled by treadmills.

See also
Naval history of China

References

Chinese inventions
Human-powered watercraft
Marine propulsion
Naval ships of China
Southern Qi